Martina Trevisan defeated Claire Liu in the final, 6–2, 6–1 to win the singles tennis title at the 2022 Morocco Open. It was her maiden WTA Tour title.

Maria Sakkari was the defending champion when the tournament was last held in 2019, but she chose not to participate.

Seeds

Draw

Finals

Top half

Bottom half

Qualifying

Seeds

Qualifiers

Lucky losers

Qualifying draw

First qualifier

Second qualifier

Third qualifier

Fourth qualifier

References 

 Main draw
 Qualifying draw

2022 Grand Prix SAR La Princesse Lalla Meryem - 
2022 WTA Tour